{{DISPLAYTITLE:C5H8N2O5}}
The molecular formula C5H8N2O5 (molar mass: 176.13 g/mol, exact mass: 176.0433 u) may refer to:

 Carbamoyl aspartic acid (or ureidosuccinic acid)
 Oxalyldiaminopropionic acid